Foreign relations were established between Bahrain and Portugal on 10 June 1976. Portugal maintains an honorary consulate in Mahazza, Bahrain.
On 26 May 2015 a convention was signed in Manama between Portugal and Bahrain for the Avoidance of Double Taxation and the Prevention of Fiscal Evasion with respect to taxes on income.

Portugal has a non-resident Ambassador in Riyadh (Saudi Arabia) accredited to Bahrain.

First diplomatic mission 

On 10 July 1989, resident Ambassador in Riyadh, José Manuel de Matos Parreira, presented his letters of credence as non-resident ambassador.

History

Bahrain was ruled by the Portuguese Empire from 1521 until 1602, when they were expelled by Shah Abbas I of the Safavid dynasty.

Portuguese rule

Ahmad Bin Majid, the Arab navigator, arrived in Bahrain in 1489 prior to the Portuguese' arrival in the region and gave an account of the country: "In Awal (Bahrain) there are 360 villages and fresh water can be found in a number of places. A most wonderful al-Qasasir, where a man can dive into the salt sea with a skin and can fill it with fresh water while he is submerged in the salt water. Around Bahrain are pearl fisheries and a number of islands all of which have pearl fisheries and connected with this trade are 1,000 ships" (Majid, Arab Navigation in the Indian Ocean before the Coming of the Portuguese. Trans. G.R. Tibbetts. The Royal Asisatic Society of Great Britain and Ireland, 1981. page 222).

Portuguese expansion into the Indian Ocean in the early 16th century followed Vasco da Gama's voyages of exploration in which the Portuguese battled the Ottomans up the coast of the Persian Gulf. The Portuguese, drawn in by the lucrative trade routes of the Gulf, sought control of the strategic Ormus region before setting its sights on Bahrain. Portuguese ships first entered the Gulf in 1485, the first reputed Portuguese traveller to visit Bahrain was Duarte Barbosa. After the Kingdom of Hormuz fell in 1507, Hormuz' political control of Bahrain was lost after the island fell to the princes of Al-Hasa. A combined Portuguese-Hormuz force led by António Correia conquered Bahrain in 1521 only to briefly lose it to the princes of Al-Hasa the same year. In response, the Portuguese sent another expedition to Bahrain and the Arabian coast to subdue the Al-Hasa attempts to regain power.

The Portuguese later consolidated their position of the island by reconstructing the Qal'at al Bahrain fortress, which was to serve as the base for the Portuguese garrison. It is believed that the Portuguese ruled the islands via indirect rule, with some force, against the inhabitants for eighty years, despite incurring several revolts and protests (one of which resulted in temporary independence in 1534). Such a revolt was the rebellion of 1529 saw the deployment of a 400-man Portuguese force sent to subdue the island.

Except for a brief period in 1559 when the governor of the Ottoman province of Al-Hasa tried to occupy the islands but were repelled, the Portuguese remained in control until they were driven out of the island in 1602, when a popular uprising led by Rukn ed-Din took control of the Bahrain Fort. The uprising was sparked by the governor's order of the execution of the island's richest traders. Portuguese attempts to retake Bahrain were thwarted due to aid from the prince of Shiraz. The uprising coincided with regional disputes between the Portuguese and rival European powers. The power vacuum that resulted was almost immediately filled by the Persian ruler, Shah Abbas I, who deployed a Persian garrison to the Bahrain Fort and subsumed it within the Safavid Empire.

Sports

In September 2007, Bahrain's Prince Nasser bin Hamad Al Khalifa led the Bahrain Royal Endurance Team in the FEI European Endurance Championship Open, an equestrian endurance riding event, held in Portugal. He finished 8th in the individual race, and Bahrain came in second in the team event and won a silver medal.

Trade

In  Bahraini dinars

Diplomatic visits

See also
 Foreign relations of Bahrain
 Foreign relations of Portugal

References

 
Portugal
Bilateral relations of Portugal